The 2020–21 Doncaster Rovers F.C. season is the club's 142nd season in their history and the fourth consecutive season in EFL League One, Along with League One, the club also participated in the FA Cup, EFL Cup and EFL Trophy.

The season covers the period from 1 July 2020 to 30 June 2021.

Pre-season
Donny announced 6 pre-season friendlies against Manchester United U23s, Bradford City, and Scunthorpe United, plus a home and away tie against a Championship club yet to be announced, and a non league game.

Competitions

EFL League One

League table

Results summary

Results by matchday

Matches

The 2020–21 season fixtures were released on 21 August.

FA Cup

The draw for the first round was made on Monday 26, October. The second round draw was revealed on Monday, 9 November by Danny Cowley. The third round draw was made on 30 November, with Premier League and EFL Championship clubs all entering the competition. The draw for the fourth and fifth round were made on 11 January, conducted by Peter Crouch.

EFL Cup

The first round draw was made on 18 August, live on Sky Sports, by Paul Merson.

EFL Trophy

The regional group stage draw was confirmed on 18 August.

Squad

Detailed overview 
Players with previous first team games or current professional contracts with Doncaster before the start of the season, including those coming in from the Academy.
League caps and goals up to the start of season 2019–20.
Players with name and squad number struck through and marked  left the club during the playing season.

Statistics 
This includes any players featured in a match day squad in any competition.

|-
!colspan=6|Players who left the club during the season''

|-
|}

Goals record
.

Disciplinary record
.

Transfers

Transfers in

Loans in

Loans out

Transfers out

Awards

PFA League One Player of the Month

Sky Bet League One Player of the Month

Sky Bet League One Goal of the Month

Sky Bet League One Manager of the Month

References

Doncaster Rovers
Doncaster Rovers F.C. seasons